The Campeonato Argentino de Rugby 1959 was won by the selection of Buenos Aires Province ("Provincia") that beat in the final the selection of Capital.

Rugby Union in Argentina in 1959
 The Buenos Aires Champsionship was won by Buonos Aires CRC
 The Cordoba Province Championship was won by Universitario
 The North-East Championship was won by Universitario Tucuman
 The selection of Junior Springboks, 27 years after their first tour, visit Argentina and Chile, winning all the 13 matches (two against Argentina national team)

Knock out stages 
("Provincia" and "Capital" directly admitted to quarter of finals)

Semifinals 

 Provincia: H. Rosenblat, E. Bianchetti, J. Guidi, A. Salinas, O. Bernacchi, J. Sascaro, E. Holmgreen, J. Pulido, F. Varela, A. Moreno, R. Schimdt, B. Otaño, J. Lucas, J. Casanegra, O. Martínez.
 La Plata: J. Manes, P. Grossi, R. La Rosa, R. Wilt, R. Posadas, E. Cáceres, J. Buriñigo, E. Foulkes, H. Carnicero, A. Nogueira, A. Cervini, L. Nápoli, R. Goso, A. Dentone, R. Gorostiaga.

 Capital: R. Raimundez, C. Raimundez, E. Karplus, L. Mendez, C. Giuliano, A Guastella, V. Mayol, S. Hogg, M. Azpiroz, J. La¬fleur, J. Trebotich, R. Rumboll, E. Gaviña, H. Vidou, E. Verardo
 Norte: Nougués, J. Terán, C. Valdez, A. Peiró, J. Esteban, J. Nucci, A. Frías Silva, O. Paz, L. Nieva Moreno, J. Paz, C. Diam¬bra, J. Carlino, J. Ritorto, J. Centurión, R. Terán Vega

Final 

 Provincia : R. Raimundez, C. Giuliano, E. Karplus, L. Mendez, C. Raimundez, A. Guastella, V. Mayol, J. Lafleur, M. Azpiroz, S. Hogg, R. Hogg, J. Trebotich, E. Verardo, H. Vidou, E. Gaviña.
 Capital: H. Rosenblat, E. Bianchetti, J. Álvarez, J. Guidi, O. Bernacchi, J. Sascaro, E. Holmgreen, A. Moreno, F. Varela, J. Pulido, R. Schmidt, B. Otaño, O. Martínez, J. Casanegra, J. Lucas

The referee of the match was the South African Ackermann, that was following the South African selection of Junior Springboks, that ended his tour in South America.  The selection of "Capital" and Provincia, was without with the national team against South Africa.
In the same day, was arranged a match between two mixed teams of Southafrican and Argentine and players.

External links 
 Memorias de la UAR 1959

Campeonato Argentino de Rugby
Argentina
Campeonato